"We Want Our Daddy Dear, Back Home (Hello Central, Give Me France)" is a World War I song written by James M. Reilly and composed by Harry De Costa. The song was first published in 1918 by M. Witmark & Sons in New York City. The sheet music cover features a vitagraph photo of Aida Norton and a seated child.

The sheet music can be found at the Pritzker Military Museum & Library.

References 

Bibliography

1918 songs
Songs about fathers
Songs about soldiers
Songs of World War I